The billiards and snooker events at the 2007 Southeast Asian Games were held at the Sima Thani Hotel Grand Ballroom, Nakhon Ratchasima from 7 December to 14 December. There were thirteen events in total, ten men's and three women's. Thailand was the most successful nation overall, winning five gold medals.

Medal winners

Men

Women

External links
Southeast Asian Games Official Results

References

2007 Southeast Asian Games events
Cue sports at the Southeast Asian Games
2007 in cue sports
Cue sports competitions in Thailand